The following lists events that happened during 1976 in Cape Verde.

Incumbents
President: Aristides Pereira
Prime Minister: Pedro Pires

Events

Sports
CS Mindelense won the Cape Verdean Football Championship

Births
Gilyto, singer
March 21: Carlos Pedro Silva Morais, nickname: Caló, footballer
October 26: Carla Sousa, basketball player

References

 
Years of the 20th century in Cape Verde
1970s in Cape Verde
Cape Verde
Cape Verde